Olutasidenib, sold under the brand name Rezlidhia, is an anticancer medication used to treat relapsed or refractory acute myeloid leukemia. Olutasidenib is an isocitrate dehydrogenase-1 (IDH1) inhibitor. It is taken by mouth.

The most common adverse reactions include nausea, fatigue/malaise, arthralgia, constipation, leukocytosis, dyspnea, fever, rash, mucositis, diarrhea, and transaminitis.

Olutasidenib was approved for medical use in the United States in December 2022.

Medical uses 
Olutasidenib is indicated for the treatment of adults with relapsed or refractory acute myeloid leukemia with a susceptible isocitrate dehydrogenase-1 (IDH1) mutation as detected by an FDA-approved test.

Society and culture

Names 
Olutasidenib is the international nonproprietary name.

References

Further reading

External links 
 
 

Antineoplastic drugs
Orphan drugs
Nitriles
Pyridones
Chloroarenes
Quinolones